The sixth and final season of the American serial drama television series Lost commenced airing in the United States and Canada on February 2, 2010.  The sixth-season premiere was the first to climb in the ratings year-over-year since the second season, drawing 12.1 million viewers. The season aired Tuesdays at 9:00 pm from February 2 to May 18. The series finale aired on Sunday, May 23, 2010. The finale ran two-and-a-half hours starting at 9:00 pm—pushing the local news back a half—followed by the previously announced post-finale special, Jimmy Kimmel Live: Aloha to Lost, at 12:05 am. The season continues the stories of the survivors of the fictional September 22, 2004, crash of Oceanic Airlines Flight 815 on a mysterious island in the South Pacific. The survivors must deal with two outcomes of the detonation of a nuclear bomb on the island in the 1970s. While the on-island story continues, "flash sideways" show a second timeline, in which Flight 815 never crashes. The season was released on DVD and Blu-ray on August 24, 2010, alongside a complete series box set. Included in the special features was "The New Man in Charge", a previously unaired shortened episode that serves as an epilogue following the events of the finale.

Production
On May 7, 2007, ABC Entertainment President Stephen McPherson announced that Lost would end during the 2009–2010 season with a "highly anticipated and shocking finale." "We felt that this was the only way to give Lost a proper creative conclusion," McPherson said. Beginning with the 2007–2008 television season, the final 48 episodes would have been aired as three seasons with 16 episodes each, with Lost concluding in its sixth season. Due to 2007–2008 Writers Guild of America strike, the fourth season featured 14 episodes, and season 5 had 17 episodes. Season six was planned to have 17 episodes, too. However, on June 29, 2009 it was announced that the final season would feature an additional hour, making the number of episodes 18.

Executive producers Damon Lindelof and Carlton Cuse stated that they "always envisioned Lost as a show with a beginning, middle, and end," and that by announcing when the show would end that viewers would "have the security of knowing that the story will play out as we've intended." Lindelof and Cuse stated that securing the 2010 series-end date "was immensely liberating" and helped the series rediscover its focus. Lindelof noted, "We're no longer stalling."  The producers planned to wrap up mysteries, such as the reason the Dharma periodic resupply drops continue after the purge, Walt's unusual abilities, and the "bird" from "Exodus" and "Live Together, Die Alone". Although these mysteries, among others, were left unresolved in the season, all three were answered or touched upon in the series epilogue, "The New Man in Charge." Matthew Fox said in an interview that in the final season, the characters of Jack Shephard and John Locke "will come head to head." It was also claimed that a third of the way through the final season, the two timelines would be "solidified into one" and "will be very linear – no more flashbacks, nothing;" however this did not become the case. He also claimed to be the only cast member to know the ending of the series, though Lindelof has clarified that Fox only knew things that were relevant to his character.

During the 2009 San Diego Comic-Con, numerous sixth-season reports were made. Carlton Cuse stated both the time travel and flash-forward seasons were over, and they were moving into something different for the sixth season. Josh Holloway stated his character Sawyer would revert to his old self after the loss of Juliet. Cuse and Lindelof stated that the Dharma Initiative would no longer play a large role in the show, but the "Dharma-Michigan connection" would play a significant role in season six. However, this did not happen. Lindelof stated that the producers had a direct hand in the production of the season six promotional poster that was first displayed at Comic-Con, and that everything in it was intentional; he also made a reference to the Abbey Road cover in connection to the poster. Season six was the first and only season of Lost ever to not feature any kind of preview or official promotional material such as sneak peeks and promo pictures for future episodes since the Lost producers considered any single frame from the first episodes to be too revealing. According to Lindelof, "even a single scene from the show would basically tip what it is we're doing this year, and what it is we're doing this year is different than what we've done in other years."  Lindelof has also emphasized that the flashes-sideways are important, stating "People are saying [they] don't need these stories and all we can say is they're absolutely 100 percent necessary to tell the story of Lost, and hopefully by the end of the season it will be more obvious as to why." He also noted that the term "flash-sideways" was deliberately used instead of "alternate reality" because viewers might otherwise "infer that one of them isn't real, or one of them is real and the other is the alternate to being real." When asked to describe the last three episodes, Lindelof said "Water."

ABC charged advertisers $900,000 USD for a 30-second commercial during the series finale, in contrast to the standard 2010 season price of $214,000.

Cast

The cast features 15 major roles with star billing: 11 return from the fifth season, one returns from the fourth season after a year's absence, and three are new regular cast members. Unlike the latter half of the previous season, in which the cast was divided into two groups following two separate storylines, Season Six features an alternate universe scenario which the producers call "flash-sideways," and almost all the main characters participate in both storylines. Returning from the fifth season are the survivors' leader Dr. Jack Shephard (Matthew Fox); former fugitive Kate Austen (Evangeline Lilly); millionaire Hugo "Hurley" Reyes (Jorge Garcia); former torturer Sayid Jarrah (Naveen Andrews); con artist James "Sawyer" Ford (Josh Holloway); medium Miles Straume (Ken Leung); former mob-enforcer Jin-Soo Kwon (Daniel Dae Kim) and his privileged wife Sun Kwon (Yunjin Kim); leader of the island's native population, known as the "Others," Ben Linus (Michael Emerson); deceased crash survivor John Locke, who lives on in the sideways timeline but has been impersonated in the original timeline by the mysterious Man In Black (Terry O'Quinn); and former islander Desmond Hume (Henry Ian Cusick), who starts the season off the island. Emilie de Ravin reprises her role as Claire Littleton, a new mother who was absent for one season after disappearing on the Island. The new main cast roles are pilot Frank Lapidus (Jeff Fahey), Richard Alpert (Nestor Carbonell), an ageless advisor to the Others, and mysterious Flight 316 leader Ilana Verdansky (Zuleikha Robinson). Carbonell was named a main cast member by the executive producers at Comic-Con 2009, after guest starring in the previous three seasons, and Fahey and Robinson were confirmed after appearing in recurring roles in the fourth and fifth seasons.

Several former cast members also returned to the show for the final season. Elizabeth Mitchell returns as fertility specialist Dr. Juliet Burke, Dominic Monaghan returns as deceased rock star Charlie Pace, and Jeremy Davies returns as deceased physicist Daniel Faraday. Ian Somerhalder reprises his role as deceased Flight 815 crash survivor Boone Carlyle, as does Rebecca Mader as anthropologist Charlotte Lewis. Harold Perrineau and Cynthia Watros, who portray Michael Dawson and Libby Smith, respectively, return in the second half of the season. About the return of Libby, Cuse stated, "Finally, all of your questions [about Libby] will be answered", however, Lindelof jokingly responded, "No, they will not". Michelle Rodriguez, another second season star, returns as police officer Ana Lucia Cortez, following a brief cameo in the fifth season. Maggie Grace, who portrays Shannon Rutherford, Boone's stepsister, was asked to return at the beginning of the season, but Grace was unable due to her schedule; though she eventually did make an appearance in one episode. Adewale Akinnuoye-Agbaje, who played the deceased Mr. Eko, was in negotiations to return, but these negotiations failed because of difficulties with fees. Furthermore, the producers wished to bring back the character of Walt Lloyd, however Malcolm David Kelley, who portrays Walt, had aged significantly and the producers were unable to overcome this obstacle. Kelley eventually appeared in the epilogue of the series, "The New Man in Charge."

Numerous recurring characters who reprised their roles for the final season include: Jack and Claire's father, Dr. Christian Shephard (John Terry), wealthy industrialist and former Other Charles Widmore (Alan Dale), Desmond's wife Penny Widmore (Sonya Walger), former Other Eloise Hawking (Fionnula Flanagan), Locke's ex-girlfriend, Helen Norwood (Katey Sagal), Hurley's former boss, Randy Nations (Billy Ray Gallion), mysterious Flight 316 passenger Bram (Brad William Henke), Sayid's wife, Nadia (Andrea Gabriel), deceased Frenchwoman Danielle Rousseau (Mira Furlan), science teacher Leslie Arzt (Daniel Roebuck), deceased one-eyed Other Mikhail Bakunin (Andrew Divoff), the Others' doctor Ethan Rom (William Mapother), Ben Linus' father Roger (Jon Gries), mercenaries Martin Keamy (Kevin Durand) and Omar (Anthony Azizi), and Vincent, a dog who survived the crash of Flight 815 and lives on the island. Furthermore, Greg Grunberg briefly reprises his role as Flight 815 pilot Seth Norris in a voice over in the season premiere. Mark Pellegrino reprises his role as Jacob, the mysterious figure in charge of the island, while Titus Welliver also reprises his role as the mysterious unnamed character, known only as "The Man in Black", who appeared to be antagonistic to him in the season 5 finale. L. Scott Caldwell and Sam Anderson reprised their roles as Rose Henderson and Bernard respectively, as does Kimberley Joseph who plays 815 stewardess-turned-Other Cindy. Also, Academy Award-winner Fisher Stevens returns as communications officer George Minkowski from the first few episodes of the fourth season in the eleventh episode. Kevin Tighe returns as Anthony Cooper, Locke's father. Also, minor characters such as Lynn Karnoff (Suzanne Krull) and Dr. Douglas Brooks (Bruce Davison) return.

Several new recurring characters were introduced in the sixth season. Also, William Atherton was cast in a guest role as the principal of the school where Ben works. Sheila Kelley was cast in a recurring role that was initially described as "Kendall" and later confirmed to be "Zoe". Kelley appeared in five episodes, starting with "Recon".

Reception
On Rotten Tomatoes, the season has an approval rating of 68% with an average score of 8.7 out of 10 based on 34 reviews. The website's critical consensus reads, "Losts shift in central mythology won't satisfy all viewers, but persistent fans will find solace in the show's strong performances and continued dedication to its themes."

The season premiere was watched by 12 million American viewers and the series finale was watched by 13.5 million American viewers. The entire season averaged 10 million viewers.

The sixth and final season was nominated for twelve Emmy Awards at the 62nd Primetime Emmy Awards, including Outstanding Drama Series, Outstanding Writing for a Drama Series for Carlton Cuse and Damon Lindelof for the series finale, "The End", Outstanding Directing for a Drama Series for Jack Bender for "The End", Outstanding Lead Actor in a Drama Series for Matthew Fox, Outstanding Supporting Actor in a Drama Series for Michael Emerson and Terry O'Quinn, Outstanding Guest Actress in a Drama Series for Elizabeth Mitchell, Outstanding Art Direction for a Single Camera Series for "Ab Aeterno", Outstanding Music Composition for a Series (Original Dramatic Score) for Michael Giacchino for "The End", Outstanding Sound Editing for a Series for "The End", and Outstanding Sound Mixing for a Comedy or Drama Series (One Hour) for "The End". It won only one Emmy, for Outstanding Single Camera Picture Editing for a Drama Series for "The End".

Episodes

The season premiered on February 2, 2010, with a double-length episode (two hours including commercials) preceded by a one-hour clip show, titled "Lost: Final Chapter". The show continued from February 9 in its new timeslot of Tuesdays at 9:00 pm, with a total of 18 episodes airing in 16 broadcasts, ending with a two-and-a-half-hour series finale, which aired Sunday, May 23, 2010, preceded by a one-hour clip show, titled "Lost: The Final Journey". Additionally, the first hour of the premiere episode was screened to an estimated 15,000 fans on Waikiki Beach on January 30. In the following table, the number in the "No. in series" column refers to the episode's number within the overall series, whereas the number in the "No. in season" column refers to the episode's number within this particular season. "U.S. viewers (million)" refers to the number of Americans in millions who watched the episode as it was aired.

Home media release

References

External links

List of Lost season 6 episodes at Lostpedia

Lost (TV series)
2010 American television seasons
 
Television series set in 2004
Television series set in 2007
Limbo